Dafydd Carter (born 12 February 1992) is a Welsh professional rugby union and rugby league footballer.

International honours
Dafydd Carter won a cap for Wales while at Crusaders in 2010.

References

External links
(archived by web.archive.org) Scorpions sign Wales under 18 captain Dafydd Carter
(archived by web.archive.org) Profile at scorpionsrl.com

1992 births
Living people
Bargoed RFC players
Crusaders Rugby League players
Footballers who switched code
Place of birth missing (living people)
Rugby league five-eighths
Rugby union centres
South Wales Scorpions players
Wales national rugby league team players
Welsh rugby league players
Welsh rugby union players